McNabb is a village in Putnam County, Illinois, United States. The population was 285 at the 2010 census, down from 310 in 2000. It is part of the Ottawa Micropolitan Statistical Area. Just outside of McNabb is the Clear Creek Meeting House, one of the few surviving western Quaker meeting houses. The Meeting House once hosted local abolitionists, such as Benjamin Lundy. 

In 1900, the Indiana, Illinois, and Iowa Railroad wanted a station in Magnolia township. Hon. J. M. McNabb, at that time county judge, promoted it and the resulting station and town were named after him. Today the Toluca, Marquette & Northern Railroad also runs through the town.

Geography
McNabb is located at  (41.176355, -89.208522).

Demographics

As of the census of 2000, there were 310 people, 125 households, and 91 families residing in the village. The racial makeup of the village was 100.00% White.

There were 125 households, out of which 34.4% had children under the age of 18 living with them, 62.4% were married couples living together, 5.6% had a female householder with no husband present, and 26.4% were non-families. 24.0% of all households were made up of individuals, and 12.0% had someone living alone who was 65 years of age or older. The average household size was 2.48 and the average family size was 2.92.

In the village, the population was spread out, with 25.2% under the age of 18, 7.7% from 18 to 24, 30.3% from 25 to 44, 24.2% from 45 to 64, and 12.6% who were 65 years of age or older. The median age was 37 years. For every 100 females, there were 103.9 males. For every 100 females age 18 and over, there were 103.5 males.

The median income for a household in the village was $51,389, and the median income for a family was $55,357. Males had a median income of $32,083 versus $22,143 for females. The per capita income for the village was $20,374. About 5.7% of families and 5.6% of the population were below the poverty line, including 12.3% of those under age 18 and none of those age 65 or over.

References

Villages in Putnam County, Illinois
Villages in Illinois
Ottawa, IL Micropolitan Statistical Area